Darraðarljóð is a skaldic poem in Old Norse found in chapter 157 of Njáls saga. The song, which is seen in a vision by a man named Dorrud, the song consists of 11 stanzas, and within it twelve :valkyries weave and choose who is to be slain at the Battle of Clontarf (fought outside Dublin in 1014). Their loom uses human entrails as warp and woof, swords as treadles, an arrow as the batten and men's heads as weights. Of the twelve valkyries weaving, six of their names are given: Hildr, Hjörþrimul, Sanngriðr, Svipul, Guðr, and Göndul. Stanza 9 of the song reads:
Now awful it is to be without,
as blood-red rack races overhead;
is the welkin gory with warriors' blood
as we valkyries war-songs chanted.
At the end of the poem, the valkyries sing "start we swiftly with steeds unsaddled—hence to battle with brandished swords!" The poem may have influenced the concept of the Three Witches in Shakespeare's Macbeth.

Darrað or Dorrud's vision is located in Caithness and the story is a "powerful mixture of Celtic and Old Norse imagery".

In popular culture

Einar Selvik and Trevor Morris used stanzas from Darraðarljóð in the opening battle in season 2 of Vikings.

Darraðarljóð was set to music by the Icelandic composer Jón Leifs in 1964 (Op.60). It was composed for mixed chorus and orchestra. To date it remains unperformed.

Notes

References

 Crawford, Barbara E. (1987) Scandinavian Scotland. Leicester University Press. 
 Hollander, Lee Milton (1980). Old Norse Poems: The Most Important Nonskaldic Verse Not Included in the Poetic Edda. Forgotten Books. 
 Ingólfsson, Árni Heimir (2019) Jón Leifs and the Musical Invention of Iceland. Indiana University Press 
 Simek, Rudolf (2007) translated by Angela Hall. Dictionary of Northern Mythology. D.S. Brewer

External links
Darraðarljóð in Old Norse from «Kulturformidlingen norrøne tekster og kvad» Norway.
Two versions of the original text
Translation of the relevant part of Njal's saga
One version and a translation in English

Skaldic poems